This article lists events that occurred during 1973 in Estonia.

Incumbents

Events
Eesti Power Plant were commissioned.

Births

Deaths

References

 
1970s in Estonia
Estonia
Estonia
Years of the 20th century in Estonia